Aruba competed at the 2015 World Aquatics Championships in Kazan, Russia from 24 July to 9 August 2015.

Swimming

Aruban swimmers have achieved qualifying standards in the following events (up to a maximum of 2 swimmers in each event at the A-standard entry time, and 1 at the B-standard):

Men

Women

Synchronized swimming

Aruba has qualified two synchronized swimmers to compete in each of the following events.

Women

References

External links
Aruba Swimming Federation

Nations at the 2015 World Aquatics Championships
2015
World Aquatics Championships